Dallupura is a village on the outskirts of the Trans-Yamuna region of Delhi, India. this is Gurjars village of DEDHA'S this village is best known for its traditional Gurjar life   It is situated near Uttar Pradesh (UP) New Okhla Industrial Development Authority(NOIDA) border alongside Vasundhra Enclave and Kondli. It is one of the 24 DEDHA villages that are situated in the Trans Yamuna region.  Hindon canal runs along one side of the village. It is well connected to Noida, Ghaziabad and rest of the Delhi. It falls under Kondli legislative assembly constituency(Reserved) and East Delhi parliamentary constituency.

This village is surrounded by 56 CGHS Societies and has good infrastructure facilities. Dharamshila Hospital lies on the outskirts of the village. Four schools are adjacent to this village, namely Cosmos Public School, Evergreen Public School, Somerville School and Starex International School, Dashmesh Public School. Maharaja Agrasen College, affiliated to Delhi University (DU), is also situated in this region. The closest Metro station is 2  km from the village. One is New Ashok Nagar Metro station and the other is Noida sec.15 Metro Station. 

Well known organization ‘Child and Youth Welfare Society’ registered here in and working Pan India and overseas for Social and Skill Development.

Demographics
 India census, Dallupura had a population of 132,628. Males constitute 54% of the population and females 46%. Dallupura has an average literacy rate of 65%, higher than the national average of 59.5%: male literacy is 73% and, female literacy is 56%. In Dallupura, 15% of the population is under 6 years of age.

References

Cities and towns in East Delhi district
Villages in East Delhi district